Chrysotachina amazonica is a species of fly in the genus Chrysotachina of the family Tachinidae.

References

Tachininae
Insects described in 1934
Insects of Central America